Thomas Edward Bannon (May 8, 1869 – January 26, 1950), nicknamed "Ward Six" and "Uncle Tom", was a professional baseball player and manager. He played Major League Baseball for the New York Giants in 1895 and 1896, mostly as an outfielder. Bannon was 5 feet, 8 inches tall and weighed 175 pounds.

Career
Bannon was born in Amesbury, Massachusetts in 1869 and grew up in Saugus, Massachusetts. He started his professional baseball career in 1891. During the 1895 season, he played for the Eastern League's Scranton Coal Heavers and the National League's New York Giants; he had batting averages of .340 for Scranton and .270 for New York. Early in the following season, Bannon appeared in two games for the Giants, which was his last major league experience. He spent most of the summer in the Atlantic League, where he batted .387.

From 1897 to 1901, Bannon played for various teams in the Eastern League. Among his teammates in those years was his younger brother, Jimmy. In 1898, while with the Montreal Royals, Tom batted .287. The following year, he batted .274 and led the league with 64 stolen bases.

Bannon went to the Connecticut State League in 1902, played there for three seasons, and then moved on to the New England League. In 1909, he became a player-manager for the Lowell Tigers. In 1910, he was a player-manager of the Connecticut Association's Middletown Jewels, where he batted .282 in the final season of his playing career. He managed two teams in 1911.

Bannon was an umpire in the New England League for several years afterwards and then worked in the supply department for the General Electric Company. He died in Lynn, Massachusetts, in 1950 and was buried in St. Joseph Cemetery.

References

External links

1869 births
1950 deaths
Major League Baseball outfielders
Major League Baseball first basemen
New York Giants (NL) players
19th-century baseball players
People from Saugus, Massachusetts
Sportspeople from Essex County, Massachusetts
Baseball players from Massachusetts
Minor league baseball managers
Lynn (minor league baseball) players
Portland (minor league baseball) players
Pawtucket Maroons players
Scranton Coal Heavers players
New York Metropolitans (minor league) players
Syracuse Stars (minor league baseball) players
Rochester Brownies players
Montreal Royals players
Kansas City Blues (baseball) players
Toronto Canucks players
New London Whalers players
South Bend Greens players
Hartford Senators players
Lynn Shoemakers players
Lawrence Colts players
Brockton Tigers players
Lowell Tigers players
Haverhill Hustlers players
Middletown Jewels players
Burials in Massachusetts